The University of Tehran, Department of Mining Engineering was among the first four engineering departments established in the University of Tehran. The main responsibility of this department as the first formal education institution in mining engineering in Iran, was to train experts and professionals who could help exploiting the substantial potential of the country in natural resources, mineral deposits, and mining prospects. Within last 72 years, many mining engineers have received education and training in this school in various levels. These graduates have successfully worked in exploration, mining, geotechnical and geological engineering, rock mechanics, mineral processing, petroleum engineering, water extraction, and industrial mineral applications in and outside the country.

Currently, the School of Mining Engineering has about 290 undergraduate and 135 graduate students. The graduate programs offered in this school include:
 
 Extraction
 Exploration
 Mineral processing
 Rock Mechanics
 Petroleum Exploration

Undergraduate students should pass 140 credit hours including 3 credit hours of senior project, 20 credit hours of humanities, basic engineering math, physics, and chemistry, applied geology courses, and mining related topics with several credit hours of field training. In the undergraduate degree programs, students should also take job training in the mining industries in two consecutive summers each for 320 hours of active work in a mine. Master students are required to take 32 credit hours including 6 credit hours of thesis and 2 credit hours of seminar. The Ph.D. program usually takes about four years including the Ph.D. research work and dissertation preparation.
 
The school holds collaborative research and supervision of postgraduate students with several other foreign universities. The School of Mining Engineering also participates in the activities of Institute of Petroleum Engineering of Faculty of Engineering, which is a newly established research institute mainly funded by the Ministry of Petroleum as well as many partners in the oil and gas industry.

School of Mining Engineering currently has 20 full-time and several prominent adjunct faculty members. It has several research laboratories and educational workshops including Mineral Processing, Rock Mechanics, Mineralogy, Petrology, Cartography, Geophysics, Geochemistry, XRD Lab, Analytical Lab, Industrial Mineral Application Lab, Mineral and Rock Museum, and a computer center.

References

Mining
Engineering universities and colleges in Iran
Schools of mines
University and college departments
Mining in Iran